Constitutional Assembly elections were held in the Dominican Republic on 13 November 1955. The role of the Assembly was to review and amend certain articles of the constitution.

References

Dominican Republic
1955 in the Dominican Republic
Elections in the Dominican Republic
November 1955 events in North America
Election and referendum articles with incomplete results